Catherine "Cathy" LeFrançois (formerly Priest) is a professional female bodybuilder and figure competitor from Canada. She was ranked as the 10th best female bodybuilder in the  IFBB Pro Women's Bodybuilding Ranking List, as of 2013.

Early life and education
Cathy LeFrançois was born on February 12, 1971, in Amqui, Quebec. She was adopted at the age of 4 and has two sisters, Nancy and Annie, and one brother, Joy-Yan. Her mother was a nurse and her dad was a school cook. They were both  focused on working to build their retirement and provide for their children.

LeFrançois started figure skating at age six, but after two years she moved on to speed skating, alpine skiing, tennis, and badminton. She attended Notre-Dame-de-Foy in Quebec.

Bodybuilding career

Amateur
When LeFrançois was 14 years old she noticed that a classmate, Steve Beaulieu, had big veiny forearms. She asked him how he got them. He said he was training at home with some dumbbells. After noticing her interest he brought her a magazine with Cory Everson on the cover. She immediately told him that she wanted to be like her. Later on she saw a guy, Rick Voyer, with huge legs and calves. She asked him how he got them. He said it was from speed skating, so she started speed skating and competed for many years. Her friend, Steve, always gives her motivation. At her first speed skating competition she won three gold medals. While looking for Steve at school a friend told her that he had been killed by a drunk driver. From that moment on, her entire career has been dedicated to him.

She won five medals in the Quebec provincial championships, an accomplishment that has not been equaled since. She earned her pro card in 1995 when she won the overall title at the CBBF Canada Cup.

Professional

1995-2003
LeFrançois made her pro debut at the 1995 Jan Tana Classic. In 1996, she retired from bodybuilding due to the politics of the sport. She returned to the sport in 1999.  She competed exclusively as a lightweight once weight classes were introduced in pro shows in 2000.  Her best achievement as a professional was winning the lightweight class at the 2003 Ms. International.

After 2003, she retired from bodybuilding and transitioned to figure competition, competing in her first figure contests in 2005.

2006-present
In late 2006, she switched back to bodybuilding.  She won the New York Pro in 2008, 2009, and 2010.

Contest history 
1990  regional amateur bodybuilding - 2nd
1991 CBBF Easter Canadian amateur bodybuilding championship - 1st (LW)
1993 CBBF Canadian amateur bodybuilding championship - 2nd (LW)
1994 CBBF Canadian amateur bodybuilding championship - 2nd (MW)
1995 CBBF Canada Cup III amateur bodybuilding championship - 1st (MW & overall)
1995 Jan Tana Classic - 12th
1996 Ms. International - 14th
1996 Jan Tana Classic - 8th
1999 Ms. International - 19th
1999 Jan Tana Classic - 8th
1999 IFBB Women's Extravaganza - 5th
2000 Ms. International - 3rd (LW)
2000 IFBB Ms. Olympia - 4th (LW)
2001 Ms. International - 4th (LW)
2002 Ms. International - 4th (LW)
2002 GNC Show of Strength - 2nd (LW)
2003 Ms. International - 1st (LW)
2003 IFBB Ms. Olympia - 4th (LW)
2006 IFBB Atlantic City Pro Women's Bodybuilding - 9th
2007 Ms. International - 10th
2007 Sacramento Pro - 2nd (LW)
2008 Ms. International - 6th
2008 New York Pro - 1st
2008 IFBB Olympia - 6th
2009 IFBB Ms. International - 8th
2009 IFBB New York Women's Pro - 1st
2010 IFBB New York Pro Bodybuilding & Bikini Championships - 1st
2010 NPC Nevada State Championships - NP
2010 IFBB Pro Bodybuilding Weekly Championships - 3rd
2010 IFBB Europa Battle of Champions - 3rd
2010 IFBB Olympia - 7th
2011 IFBB Ms. International - 6th
2011 IFBB FIBO Power Pro Germany - NP
2011 IFBB Toronto Pro Super Show - 4th
2011 IFBB Pro Bodybuilding Weekly Championships - 1st
2011 IFBB Olympia- 13th
2012 IFBB Ms. International - 4th
2012 IFBB Toronto Pro Supershow - 7th
2013 IFBB Ms. International - 5th
2013 IFBB Ms. Olympia - 10th
2016 IFBB Toronto Pro Supershow - 3rd

Figure career

Contest history 
2005 IFBB Europa Supershow - DNP
2005 Sacramento Pro Figure - DNP
2006 IFBB California Pro Figure - 12th

Personal life
LeFrançois was  married to bodybuilder Lee Priest on July 1, 2000; they separated in 2005. She currently lives in El Monte, California. She is a French Canadian.

References

External links
Official website
Ironman Magazine Contest History

| colspan = 3 align = center | Ms. International 
|- 
| width = 30% align = center | Preceded by:Valentina Chepiga
| width = 40% align = center | First (2003)
| width = 30% align = center | Succeeded by:Dayana Cadeau

1971 births
Canadian expatriates in the United States
Canadian female bodybuilders
Fitness and figure competitors
French Quebecers
Living people
People from Amqui
Professional bodybuilders
People from El Monte, California
People from Lancaster, California
Sportspeople from California
Sportspeople from Los Angeles County, California
Sportspeople from Quebec